Lee Hyo-kyun (born 12 March 1988) is a South Korean football centre forward who plays for Incheon United.

Club career 

Lee was one of Gyeongnam FC's draft picks for the 2011 season.   He made his professional debut on 25 June 2011, coming on as a late substitute in Gyeongnam's home loss to the Pohang Steelers.  Lee's first professional goal opened the scoring in the 2011 K-League Cup semi-final on 6 July 2011 between Gyeongnam and Ulsan Hyundai FC, but it wasn't enough to prevent Ulsan advancing to the K-League Cup final.

During the 2012 off-season, Lee moved to league rivals Incheon United.

Club career statistics

References

External links 

1988 births
Living people
South Korean footballers
Association football forwards
K League 1 players
Gyeongnam FC players
Incheon United FC players
FC Anyang players